Qaleh-ye Now (also Romanized as Qal‘eh-ye Now, Kaleh Nau, Qal‘eh-i-Nau, and Qal‘eh Now; also known as Qal‘eh-ye Hendū) is a village in Salami Rural District, Salami District, Khaf County, Razavi Khorasan Province, Iran. At the 2006 census, its population was 681, in 135 families.

References 

Populated places in Khaf County